Vittal Subraya Karmali (unknown – 2 September 1967), alternatively spelled as Vithal Subrai Karmali, also known as V.S. Karmali or Shrirang Karmali, was an Indian politician from Goa. He was a former member of the Goa, Daman and Diu Legislative Assembly, representing the Curchorem Assembly constituency from 1963 to 1967 and Siroda Assembly constituency from 1967 to September 1967. He also served as the cabinet minister in the first Dayanand Bandodkar ministry.

Career
Karmali contested in the 1963 Goa, Daman and Diu Legislative Assembly election from the Curchorem Assembly constituency on the Maharashtrawadi Gomantak Party (MGP) ticket and emerged victorious. He served for four years from 1963 to 1967. Karmali was made the cabinet minister in the first Dayanand Bandodkar ministry and was allotted Law, Education and Public health as portfolios.

He then successfully contested in the 1967 Goa, Daman and Diu Legislative Assembly election from Siroda Assembly constituency on the MGP ticket and defeated United Goans (Sequiera Group) candidate, J. F. S. Fernandes by a margin of 3277 votes. He served for few months from 1967 until his death in September 1967, following this a by-election was held in the constituency in 1968.

Death
Karmali died on 2 September 1967, he was remembered for his role in setting up large number of primary schools in Goa as the then education minister in Dayanand Bandodkar's ministry.

Positions held
 Chairman of the Public Account Committee

References

Year of birth missing
1967 deaths
Maharashtrawadi Gomantak Party politicians
People from South Goa district
Indian politicians
20th-century Indian politicians
Goa, Daman and Diu MLAs 1963–1967
Goa, Daman and Diu MLAs 1967–1972